Arbër Mehmetllari (born 19 April 2000) is an Albanian professional footballer who currently play as a centre forward for Albanian club Dinamo Tirana, on loan from Croatian club Lokomotiva.

References

2000 births
Living people
People from Tirana County
People from Tirana
Albanian footballers
Association football forwards
First Football League (Croatia) players
Kategoria Superiore players
FK Dinamo Tirana players
Akademia e Futbollit players
NK Lokomotiva Zagreb players
NK Rudeš players
Luftëtari Gjirokastër players
KF Bylis Ballsh players
Albanian expatriates in Croatia
Albanian expatriates
Albanian expatriate footballers